Jack R. Fischel is an American academic. Fischel was a professor of history at Millersville University of Pennsylvania, where he lectured for 37 years.

Education
Fischel graduated from Hunter College (now of the City University of New York) with a B.A. in 1955. He received his Ph.D. from the University of Delaware 1973.

Books
Fischel is the author of:
The Holocaust (Greenwood, 1998)
Historical Dictionary of the Holocaust (Rowman & Littlefield, 1999; 2nd ed., Scarecrow Press, 2010)
The Holocaust and Its Religious Impact (with Susan M. Ortmann, Praeger, 2004)
He is the editor of:
Jewish-American History and Culture: An Encyclopedia (edited with Sanford Pinsker, Garland, 1992)
Encyclopedia of Jewish American Popular Culture (2008)

References

American historians
Living people
Year of birth missing (living people)
Millersville University of Pennsylvania faculty
Historians of the Holocaust